Fredrik Strand Galta (born October 19, 1992) is a Norwegian former professional road cyclist.

Major results

2011
 1st Stage 3 Eidsvollrittet
2013
 1st Hadeland GP
 10th Overall Boucle de l'Artois
2014
 3rd Road race, National Under-23 Road Championships
2015
 2nd Hadeland GP
 2nd Memorial Van Coningsloo
 4th Overall Tour of Norway
 5th Overall Tour du Loir-et-Cher
 5th Overall Kreiz Breizh Elites
1st  Points classification
1st Stages 2 & 3
2017
 9th Overall Tour du Loir-et-Cher

References

External links

 
 

1992 births
Living people
Norwegian male cyclists